Abas was an ancient Greek sophist and a rhetorician about whose life nothing is known. The Suda ascribes to him historical commentaries (in Greek ιστoρικά απoμνηατα) and a work on rhetoric (in Greek τέχνη ρητoρική).  Photius in his Myrobiblion quotes from him, belonging probably to the former work ,saying that Abas said the name of the wife of Candaulus in Greek mythology was not Nysai but Abro.

References

Sources
"Abas" in Suda
 Smith, William; Dictionary of Greek and Roman Biography and Mythology, "Abas (1)", Boston, (1867)

Roman-era Sophists
Year of birth unknown
Year of death unknown